Samuli Huhtala, professionally known as Spekti and previously as Aspekti and Uncle Damn, is a Finnish rapper.

Career

Spekti started his career in a band Trilogia in 1999. Since then, he has appeared as a featured artist on several songs, such as "Reissumies" and "Pyrkiny vähentää" by Cheek, and "A-Ha", "Rotko" and "Rähinä räp" by Fintelligens.

Spekti's first solo single "Mogausmehuu" was released in 2010. In 2013, he released two more solo singles, "Teen mitä haluun" and "Juomalaulu". All three singles appear on his first studio album Diktaattorimies, released in October 2013.

Personal life
He’s married to Emelie Björnberg. She is a fashion designer and a blogger.

Discography

Solo albums

Singles

Solo singles

Featured in

References

Living people
1979 births
Finnish rappers
Finnish hip hop musicians